Transition metal porphyrin complexes are a family of coordination complexes of the conjugate base of porphyrins.  Iron porphyrin complexes occur widely in Nature, which has stimulated extensive studies on related synthetic complexes.  The metal-porphyrin interaction is a strong one such that metalloporphyrins are thermally robust.  They are catalysts and exhibit rich optical properties, although these complexes remain mainly of academic interest.

Formation
Metal porphyrin complexes are almost always prepared by direct reaction of a metal halide with the free porphyrin, abbreviated here as H2P:
MClx  +  H2P  →   M(P)Cl2−x  +  2HCl
Two pyrrole protons are lost.  The porphyrin dianion is an L2X2 ligand.

These syntheses require somewhat forcing conditions, consistent with the tight fit of the metal in the N42- "pocket."  In nature, the insertion is mediated by chelatase enzymes.  The insertion of a metal proceeds by the intermediacy of a "sitting atop complex" (SAC), whereby the entering metal interacts with only one or a few of the nitrogen centers.

Synthetic porphyrins
In contrast to natural porphyrins, synthetic porphyrin ligands are typically symmetrical (i.e., their dianionic conjugate bases). Two major varieties are well studied, those with substituents at the meso positions, the premier example being tetraphenylporphyrin.  These ligands are easy to prepare in one-pot procedures.  A large number of aryl groups can be deployed aside from phenyl.

A second class of synthetic porphyrins have hydrogen at the meso positions.  Octaethylporphyrin (H2OEP) is the subject of many such studies. It is more expensive than tetraphenylporphyrin.

Protoporphyrin IX, which occurs naturally, can be modified by removal of the vinyl groups and esterification of the carboxylic acid groups to gives deuteroporphyin IX dimethyl ester.

Biomimetic complexes

Iron porphyrin complexes ("hemes") are the dominant metalloporphyrin complexes in nature.  Consequently, synthetic iron porphyrin complexes are well investigated.  Common derivatives are those of Fe(III) and Fe(II).  Complexes of the type Fe(P)Cl are square-pyramidal and high spin with idealized C4v symmetry.  Base hydrolysis affords the "mu-oxo dimers" with the formula [Fe(P)]2O.  These complexes have been widely investigated as oxidation catalysts.

Ferrous porphyrin complexes are significant because they exhibit biomimetic reactivity.  Typical stoichiometries of ferrous porphyrins are Fe(P)L2 where L is a neutral ligand such as pyridine and imidazole. Cobalt(II) porphyrins behave similarly to the ferrous derivatives.  They bind O2 to form dioxygen complexes.

Non-biomimetic complexes

Metalloporphyrins exhibit a variety of structural motifs, but always with the metal bound to the four nitrogen atoms.  Large metals such as zirconium, tantalum, and molybdenum form complexes with two porphyrin ligands.  Some [M(OEP)]2 feature a multiple bonds between the metals.

See also
 phthalocyanines
 macrocyclic ligand

References

Biomolecules
Chelating agents